Edmond Lupancu, is an Australian professional footballer who plays as a central defender for Western Sydney Wanderers Youth.

Club career
He made his professional debut for Melbourne Victory in a FFA Cup playoff match against Perth Glory on 24 November 2021.

Personal life
Lupancu is of Romanian descent.

References

External links

Living people
Australian soccer players
Association football defenders
South Melbourne FC players
Melbourne Victory FC players
National Premier Leagues players
Year of birth missing (living people)
Australian people of Romanian descent